For the Malaysian town with the same name, see Senai.Serviço Nacional de Aprendizagem Industrial (SENAI), Portuguese language for National Service for Industrial Training is a network of profitable secondary level professional schools established and maintained by the Brazilian Confederation of Industry (a patronal syndicate). SENAI is one of the most important institutions in the country providing formal training for specialized workers for the industry, in the areas of chemistry, mechanics, construction, etc.

SENAI has 744 operational units in all states of the Union, which offer more than 1,800 courses.

SENAI is part of an integrated social action system which was founded by industry and political leaders in the 1950s, under the leadership of Euvaldo Lodi, which includes SESI (Social Service for Industry), and the Instituto Euvaldo Lodi.

Social Services for Industry

The Brazilian Social Services for Industry (Serviço Social da Indústria (SESI)'' in Portuguese) is a private not-for-profit institution that operates throughout the country. It was set up in July 1946 with the aim of promoting social welfare, cultural development and improving the lives of workers and their families and the communities they live in.

Role

The roles of SESI and the National Industrial Apprenticeships Association(SENAI) were set out in Acts 4.048, of 22 January 1942, 4.936, of 7 November 1942, 6.246, of 5 February 1944 and 9.403, of 25 June 1946. According to these bills, the roles referred to are owed by industrial establishments classified as such by the National Confederation of Industry (CNI),along the lines that they are required to pay a monthly contribution for the funding of social work among industrial workers and their dependents for the setting up and maintenance of training schools.

Regional Departments

SESI maintains a presence in every state in Brazil and in the Federal District of Brasília through a chain of regional departments, each of which has jurisdiction and technical, financial and administrative autonomy. Its function is the delivery of social services in the areas of health, education, leisure, culture, food and the promotion of citizenship, having in mind improvements in quality of life among industrial workers and their families. Besides providing services in their activity centres and operational units, the regional departments develops operations within industry and in harmony with the needs and expectations of the workers. Various projects also benefit the community through partnerships and agreements with international and national governmental and private institutions.

Theatre

Osmar Rodrigues Cruz, theatre director, founded the SESI Popular Theatre Company in 1963, presented the play 'Murderous City' (Cidade Assessina) which took Brazilian theatre by storm. Trouxe peças de teatro e nomes da música popular brasileira, que se tornaram de bastante sucesso na época. Os ingressos eram de distribuição gratuita e disputados pela população, pois eram limitados. Osmar Cruz queria oferecer um teatro de qualidade, ajudando na formação de público das camadas menos favorecidas.

See also
CETIQT

External links
 SENAI Home Page

Schools in Brazil